John Gallus may refer to:

 John Gallus (footballer) (born 1945), Australian rules footballer
 John Gallus (politician), US politician